Lynnette Pamela Watson (born 22 November 1952), known after marriage as Lynne Bates, is an Australian backstroke swimmer of the 1960s, who won a silver medal in the 4×100-metre medley relay at the 1968 Summer Olympics in Mexico City, narrowly missing two more medals.

Coming from Western Australia, Watson combined with Janet Steinbeck, Lyn McClements and Judy Playfair to register a silver medal in the 4×100-metre medley relay, trailing the Americans home by 1.7 seconds.  Competing in the individual 100-metre freestyle, Watson was eliminated in the semifinals.  She placed sixth and fourth in the 100-metre and 200-metre backstroke respectively. She also finished fourth as part of the 4×100-metre freestyle relay team.  Two years later at the 1970 Commonwealth Games, Watson won four gold medals in both backstroke events and in the 4×100-metre freestyle and medley relays, as well as a silver in the 100-metre freestyle.  She later became a team administrator for Australia at the 1992 Summer Olympics in Barcelona.

See also
 List of Olympic medalists in swimming (women)
 List of Commonwealth Games medallists in swimming (women)

References

1952 births
Living people
Olympic swimmers of Australia
Australian female backstroke swimmers
Australian female freestyle swimmers
Sportswomen from Western Australia
Swimmers at the 1968 Summer Olympics
Western Australian Sports Star of the Year winners
Commonwealth Games gold medallists for Australia
Commonwealth Games silver medallists for Australia
Medalists at the 1968 Summer Olympics
Olympic silver medalists for Australia
Olympic silver medalists in swimming
Commonwealth Games medallists in swimming
Swimmers at the 1970 British Commonwealth Games
20th-century Australian women
Medallists at the 1970 British Commonwealth Games